"Dude" is the first single released from Jamaican musician Beenie Man's 16th studio album, Back to Basics (2004). It features Ms. Thing and was produced and written by Dave Kelly. The song is enhanced by the use of a vocoder and is on the fiesta riddim.

Kelly's Mad House label originally released "Dude" in Jamaica in 2003. Virgin Records then serviced the song to US radio in early 2004 and released it physically in the United Kingdom on 1 March 2004. The single became a top-10 hit in the United Kingdom and a top-40 hit in Italy and the United States. The music video uses the remix of the song, which features American rapper Shawnna.

Track listings

Jamaican 7-inch single
A. "Dude" (featuring Ms. Thing)
B. "Fiesta" (version)

US CD and 12-inch single
 "Dude" (album version featuring Ms. Thing) – 4:13
 "Dude" (remix featuring Ms. Thing and Shawnna) – 4:33
 "Dude" (instrumental) – 4:11
 "Dude" (a cappella featuring Ms. Thing) – 3:24

US remix 12-inch single
 "Dude" (Beenie Man featuring Ms. Thing vs. N.E.R.D.) – 4:47
 "Dude" (Sticky refix) – 4:04
 "Dude" (Panjabi Hit Squad mix) – 4:08
 "Dude" (Panjabi Hit Squad mix instrumental) – 4:09

Australian CD single
 "Dude" (album version featuring Ms. Thing) – 4:13
 "Dude" (remix featuring Ms. Thing and Shawnna) – 4:33
 "Dude" (Sticky refix) – 4:03
 "Dude" (Panjabi Hit Squad mix) – 4:07

UK CD1
 "Dude" (radio edit featuring Ms. Thing) – 3:34
 "Bossman" (video edit featuring Lady Saw and Sean Paul) – 3:00

UK CD2
 "Dude" (album version) – 4:13
 "Dude" (remix featuring Shawnna) – 4:33
 "Dude" (Sticky refix) – 4:03
 "Dude" (Panjabi Hit Squad mix) – 4:07
 "Dude" (remix video featuring Shawnna) – 4:35

UK 12-inch single
A1. "Dude" (featuring Ms. Thing) – 4:13
A2. "Dude" (Panjabi Hit Squad mix) – 4:07
B1. "Girls Dem Sugar" – 4:21
B2. "Dude" (Sticky refix) – 4:03

Charts

Weekly charts

Year-end charts

Certifications

Release history

References

2003 singles
2003 songs
Beenie Man songs
Virgin Records singles